Donald Patterson Beery (February 23, 1920 – April 2, 2016) was an American professional basketball player. He played for the Fort Wayne Zollner Pistons in the National Basketball League during the 1941–42 season and averaged 0.7 points per game.

He served in the Army during World War II and earned the Silver Star with arrowhead, Bronze Star, and the Purple Heart with 2 Oak Clusters.

References

1920 births
2016 deaths
United States Army personnel of World War II
American men's basketball players
Basketball players from Fort Wayne, Indiana
Guards (basketball)
Fort Wayne Zollner Pistons players
Recipients of the Silver Star